Clarence Curtis "Johnny" Wanner (November 29, 1885 – May 28, 1919), was a Major League Baseball player who appeared in three games for the New York Highlanders in the 1909 season. He was 1 for 8 for a batting average of .125. He reached base safely three times, including one hit and two walks, and had one stolen base.

He died in Geneseo, Illinois on May 28, 1919.

References

External links
Baseball-Reference.com

New York Highlanders players
1885 births
1919 deaths
Rock Island Islanders players
Portland Beavers players
Joplin Miners players
Jersey City Skeeters players
Hartford Senators players
Memphis Turtles players
Kewanee Boilermakers players
Omaha Rourkes players
Meriden Hopes players